The 2017 Football Federation South Australia season was the 111th season of soccer in South Australia, and the fifth under the National Premier Leagues format.

League tables

2017 National Premier Leagues SA

The National Premier League South Australia 2017 season was the fifth edition of the NPL SA as the second level domestic association football competition in South Australia (and third level within Australia overall). 12 teams took part, all playing each other twice for a total of 22 rounds.

League Table

Finals

Results

Leading Goalscorers

2017 SA State League 1

The 2017 SA State League 1 was the fifth edition of the NPL State League 1 as the second level domestic association football competition in South Australia (and third level within Australia overall). 12 teams competed, all playing each other twice for a total of 22 rounds.

Finals

2017 SA State League 2

The 2017 SA State League 2 was the second edition of the new NPL State League 2 as the third level domestic association football competition in South Australia (and fourth level within Australia overall). 12 teams competed, all playing each other twice for a total of 22 rounds.

Finals

2017 SA Regional Leagues

2017 Women's NPL

The highest tier domestic football competition in South Australia for women was known for sponsorship reasons as the PS4 Women's National Premier League.   This was the second season of the NPL format. The 8 teams played a triple round-robin for a total of 21 games.

Cup Competitions

2017 Federation Cup

South Australian soccer clubs competed in 2017 for the Federation Cup. Clubs entered from the NPL SA, the State League 1, State League 2, South Australian Amateur Soccer League and South Australian Collegiate Soccer League.

This knockout competition was won by North Eastern MetroStars.

The competition also served as the South Australian Preliminary rounds for the 2017 FFA Cup. In addition to the MetroStars, the A-League club Adelaide United qualified for the final rounds, entering at the Round of 32.

References

2017 in Australian soccer
Football South Australia seasons